This is a list of bridges and other crossings of the Illinois River from the Mississippi River upstream to the confluence of the Kankakee and Des Plaines Rivers.

Upstream, the Illinois River starts as the merger of the Des Plaines River and the Kankakee River.

References

See also
 List of crossings of the Upper Mississippi River
 List of crossings of the Lower Mississippi River

Illinois geography-related lists

Illinois River
Illinois transportation-related lists